Downfall is a 1997 South Korean film by Im Kwon-taek on the history of Korea's modern sex industry. The story revolves around an orphan girl who is tricked into prostitution and finds love with one of her clients, but she cannot break free of the pimps and procurers exploiting her.

Cast
 Shin Eun-kyung
 Han Jung-hyun
 Choi Dong-joon
 Chung Kyung-soon
 An Byung-kyung
 Bang Eun-mi
 Oh Jee-hye
 Kim Dong-soo
 Park Sang-myun
 Kim Sung-ryong
 Yoon Yoo-sun

External links
 
 

Films directed by Im Kwon-taek
1997 films
South Korean drama films
Films about prostitution in South Korea
1990s Korean-language films